Route 139 is a  west–east state highway in southeastern Massachusetts. Its western terminus is at Route 27 and Route 138 in Stoughton and its eastern terminus is at Route 14 in Duxbury. Along the way it intersects several major highways including Route 24 in Stoughton and Route 3 in Pembroke.

Route description

Route 139 begins in Stoughton Square at the southern junction of the Route 27 and 138 concurrency. The highway heads northeast until the junction with Route 24, at which point the highway heads almost due east. After the brief concurrency with Route 28 in Randolph, the highway heads in a generally east-southeasterly direction through Holbrook, the extreme southwest corner of Weymouth, the North Abington section of Abington, Rockland, Hanover, the northern edge of Pembroke, and Marshfield.

Once the highway reaches the shoreline in Marshfield, it turns in a south-southeasterly direction, passing through Fieldston, Ocean Bluff and Brant Rock, proceeding until just north of Brant Rock's esplanade. But then the highway heads west, while still signed east, for the last , passing through Cedar Crest before ending at Route 14 in Duxbury.

Major intersections

References

139
Duxbury, Massachusetts
Marshfield, Massachusetts
Pembroke, Massachusetts
Hanover, Massachusetts
Rockland, Massachusetts
Abington, Massachusetts
Weymouth, Massachusetts
Holbrook, Massachusetts
Stoughton, Massachusetts
Randolph, Massachusetts
Transportation in Norfolk County, Massachusetts
Transportation in Plymouth County, Massachusetts